Óscar Moisés Arce Ramírez (born 17 October 1995 in Torreón, Coahuila) is a professional Mexican footballer for club San Miguelito.

References

External links
 

1995 births
Living people
Association football midfielders
Mexican expatriate footballers
Santos Laguna footballers
Tampico Madero F.C. footballers
Guadalupe F.C. players
C.S. Herediano footballers
Ascenso MX players
Liga Premier de México players
Liga FPD players
Mexican expatriate sportspeople in Costa Rica
Expatriate footballers in Costa Rica
Footballers from Coahuila
Mexican footballers
Sportspeople from Torreón